Melceü't-Tabbâhîn(ملجأ الطباخين), the first Turkish cookbook was written in 1844 by Mehmed Kâmil, a scholar of forensic sciences.

See also
Ali Eşref Dede'nin Yemek Risalesi
A Manual of Turkish Cookery

References

Ottoman cuisine
Turkish cuisine
Turkish cookbooks